Aleksandra Moguchaia (born 18 August 1990) is a Russian para-athlete who represented Russia at the Paralympic Games.

Career
Moguchaia made her international debut for Russia at the 2004 Summer Paralympics. Moguchaia represented Russian Paralympic Committee athletes at the 2020 Summer Paralympics in the long jump T47 event and won a silver medal.

References

Living people
1990 births
Russian female long jumpers
Paralympic silver medalists for the Russian Paralympic Committee athletes
Paralympic medalists in athletics (track and field)
Athletes (track and field) at the 2004 Summer Paralympics
Athletes (track and field) at the 2008 Summer Paralympics
Athletes (track and field) at the 2012 Summer Paralympics
Athletes (track and field) at the 2020 Summer Paralympics
Medalists at the 2020 Summer Paralympics
Medalists at the World Para Athletics European Championships
Medalists at the World Para Athletics Championships
People from Severodvinsk
Sportspeople from Arkhangelsk Oblast
Paralympic long jumpers